Franquin was a set of two or three Australian TV specials that aired in 1958 on Melbourne television station HSV-7. Franquin was a hypnotist/entertainer (born Francis Patrick Joseph Quinn, 1914–2010).

Melbourne newspaper The Age called the series "most successful" and that HSV-7 "experienced the most favorable viewer-reaction to the series. The station was inundated with telephone calls and letters".

It is not known if kinescope recordings exist of either special. Kinescope recording was the method used to record live and as-live television in the days before video-tape, involving recording the television screen image onto 16mm film using special equipment. HSV-7 appears to have not had video-tape equipment until the early 1960s.

References

External links

Seven Network specials
1958 Australian television series debuts
1958 Australian television series endings
Black-and-white Australian television shows
English-language television shows
Australian television specials